Binnal is a village in the Yelburga taluk of Koppal district in the Indian state of Karnataka.
Binnal is 17 km from Kuknoor and 22 km from Gadag. Binnal can be reached by Gadag-Kuknoor route via Harlapur-Yarehanchinal.

Demographics
As of 2001 India census, Binnal had a population of 2,214 with 1,139 males and 1,1075 females and 392 Households.

See also
Lakkundi
Itagi
Kuknoor
Yelburga
Koppal
Karnataka

References

Villages in Koppal district